Nature Methods is a monthly peer-reviewed scientific journal covering new scientific techniques. It was established in 2004 and is published by Springer Nature under the Nature Portfolio. Like other Nature journals, there is no external editorial board and editorial decisions are made by an in-house team, although peer review by external experts forms a part of the review process.

Every year, the journal highlights a field, approach, or technique that has enabled recent major advances in life sciences research as the "Method of the Year".

According to the Journal Citation Reports, the journal had a 2021 impact factor of 47.99, ranking it first in the category "Biochemical Research Methods".

References

External links 
 
Retraction Watch
JournalGuide

Nature Research academic journals
Monthly journals
Multidisciplinary scientific journals
Publications established in 2004
English-language journals
Research methods journals